Holcomycteronus profundissimus, also known by its synonym Grimaldichthys profundissimus, is a species of deep-sea fish in the cusk-eel family.

The fish has an elongated body of a uniform sallow yellowish color. Very little is known about its  habitat, ecology and biology.

History
It was caught during an oceanographic cruise by Princess Alice of Monaco using a fish trap designed by her husband Prince Albert I. The genus to which this species belongs was initially named Grimaldichthys after the ruling family of Monaco.

For many decades it was thought to be the fish living at the greatest depth in the world until the species Abyssobrotula galatheae—one specimen of which was found at a depth of over —was described in 1977.

See also
List of organisms named after famous people (born before 1900)

References

External links

Image
HISTORICAL ACCOUNT OF THE CHONDRICHTHYAN COLLECTION OF THE OCEANOGRAPHIC MUSEUM OF MONACO

Ophidiidae
Taxa named by Louis Roule
Fish described in 1913
Deep sea fish